Edward Albert Hathway was an English footballer. He was born in Bristol, England.

Career
Hathway started his career with Bristol City in 1930, but joined Bristol Rovers in 1931 after making no league appearances for City. He then moved to Bolton Wanderers in 1932 after making no league appearances for Rovers. He joined York City in June 1933. He made a total of 239 appearances and scored 40 goals for the club and returned to Bristol following the outbreak of war. He received a benefit from the club in recognition of his services in 1943.

References

Year of birth missing
Year of death missing
Footballers from Bristol
English footballers
Association football midfielders
Bristol City F.C. players
Bristol Rovers F.C. players
Bolton Wanderers F.C. players
York City F.C. players
English Football League players